The 2022 Tipperary Senior Football Championship was the 132nd staging of the Tipperary Senior Football Championship since its establishment by the Tipperary County Board in 1887. The championship started on 30 July and ended on 16 October.

Loughmore–Castleiney were the defending champions, but lost to Upperchurch–Drombane at the semi-final stage. 

Clonmel Commercials won their 20th title after a 1-10 to 1-2 win against first time finalists Upperchurch–Drombane in the final on 16 October.

Team changes

To Championship

Promoted from the Tipperary Intermediate Football Championship
 Drom & Inch

From Championship

Relegated to the Tipperary Premier Intermediate Hurling Championship
 Moyne–Templetuohy

Group stage

Group 1

Results

Group 2

Results

Group 3

Results

Group 4

Results

Relegation

Semi-finals
The relegation semi-finals doubled up as Tom Cusack Cup quarter-finals.

Knockout stage

Bracket

Quarter-finals

Semi-finals

Final

Championship statistics

Top scorers

Overall

In a single game

References

2022 senior Gaelic football county championships
Tipperary Senior Football Championship